The Experts is an early 19th-century painting by French artist Alexandre-Gabriel Decamps. Done in oil on canvas, the painting depicts a group of monkeys examining a painting. Decamps intended The Experts to be a work of satire; the apes are dressed in the attire (Singerie) of French gentlemen, and are representative of art critics. The painting the group is examining is a landscape by Nicolas Poussin, a 17th-century French painter. Decamps' work, which was originally shown at the Paris Salon of 1839, is on display at the Metropolitan Museum of Art.

References

1837 paintings
Chimpanzees in art
Paintings in the collection of the Metropolitan Museum of Art
French paintings
Paintings about painting